Edward McFadden (1862–1922) was an Irish nationalist politician and Member of Parliament (MP) in the House of Commons of the United Kingdom of Great Britain and Ireland.

He was elected as the Irish Parliamentary Party MP for the East Donegal constituency at the 1900 general election. He did not contest the 1906 general election.

External links

 

1862 births
1922 deaths
Irish Parliamentary Party MPs
Members of the Parliament of the United Kingdom for County Donegal constituencies (1801–1922)
UK MPs 1900–1906
People from County Donegal